Legal Marriage is a 1985 Soviet drama film directed by Albert S. Mkrtchyan.

Plot 
The film tells about an actor who decides to help a sick girl go home to the capital and for this they enter into a fictitious marriage. And suddenly they begin to realize that they love each other.

Cast 
 Natalya Belokhvostikova
 Igor Kostolevskiy
 Albina Matveyeva as Filatova (as A. Matveyeva)
 Ernst Romanov as Theatre director
 Bulat Okudzhava
 Elena Sanaeva		
 Mikhail Neganov
 Aleksandr Shvorin
 Vladimir Sedov
 Nikolai Prokopovich

References

External links 
 

1985 films
1980s Russian-language films
Soviet drama films
1985 drama films
Soviet teen films